Temps d'aventura (Time for adventure) is a programme in Catalan made by Televisió de Catalunya - the Catalan public television corporation - dedicated to open-air sports or adventure sports or outdoor activities. It was first broadcast during the 2002 season following on from other programmes that had dealt with the same subject -L'aventura (1993–2000) - and winter sports -  Temps de neu (1985 - ).

It is a weekly programme and is broadcast on Thursday evenings by Canal 33 from May to November and can also be watched on the international channel TVCi. Most programmes are repeated over the weekend.

Since the 2003 season it has been broadcast in stereo.

From the 2008 season onwards it has been broadcast in 16:9 format and with subtitles in Catalan for the deaf. The DTTV broadcast also includes English subtitles. This makes it the first programme produced in-house by Televisió de Catalunya that can be watched in English.

TV3 is Televisió de Catalunya's first and main channel. All the people of Catalonia and Catalan Countries in the rest of Spain is potential viewer.

Contents

The programme normally consists of a report, with a duration of between 10 and 20 minutes on average, and several sections that have changed over the seasons.

The reports are about activities that take place in the mountains, in the air or on water and are designed to highlight the activities of people who do the sport. 

Most of the reports can be categorised into one of these four general groups: 

 relatively unknown sporting activities
 profiles of outstanding sportsmen and women in different fields
 competitions
 in-house creations

The programme includes or has included the following sections:

 racons (ideas for discovering new routes)
 nius (short news items)
 i a + ... (short reports lasting 3–5 minutes)
 alerta (safety advice from the GRAE of the Firefighterss of the Generalitat)
 embat (news about water sports)
 vici-bici (news about sports involving the bicycle)
 en forma (tips for getting fit given by instructors from DiR)
 aparador (recommendations about equipment given by specialised shops)
 musical (reports accompanied by music)
 somni d'aventura (competition to win a sports trip to a place of interest)

Internet 

The programme has always been closely linked to the Internet and this has increased over the seasons.
It started in 2002 when the programme opened its own web page. 

In 2003 video streaming began and has continued apart from short interruptions until now. It was only the second TV3 programme to incorporate this.

In 2006 the podcasting of reports began, making it the first TV3 programme and one of the first in Europe to offer this option.

In 2008 a streaming and a podcast version subtitled in English was begun. There is also a streaming version with subtitles for the deaf. Altogether, the programme can be accessed on the Internet in 6 different ways:

 streaming of the programme in Catalan
 streaming of the programme in Catalan with English subtitles
 streaming of the programme in Catalan with Catalan subtitles
 streaming of the report in Catalan
 podcast of the report in Catalan
 podcast of the report in Catalan with English subtitles

In 2008 the programme also incorporated a map browser using Google Maps which allows users to zoom in on the geographical area where the reports were made and makes it possible to view the complete report broadcast by the programme.

In 2009 simplifies the subtitles system. The programme upload reports to YouTube to be available the automatic translation to many languages. The quality improve and a HD 720 version is available too.

Most viewer participation is carried out via the web page: photo, video, competitions, posts on the forum, answers to questions, etc.

Community

In addition to the television programme and its presence on the Internet, Temps d'Aventura has been involved in other initiatives which have broadened the programme's scope.

Since 2006, and together with Open Natura, it has produced a limited number of mountain bikes painted in the programme's logo and its colours and can be won by participants in one of the competitions.

In 2007, together with Temps de Neu, it produced a wall calendar with photos of the participants in one of the competitions.

In 2007, together with the publishing house Cossetània Edicions, it published the book "Racons. 22 excursions on foot and mountain bike sent in by the programme's viewers" 

In 2008 the initiative was repeated with the book  Racons 08.  

The programme has also organised several trips and an orienteering course involving viewers from the programme.
It has also produced Buff  decorated with the programme's colours and logo.

Prizes

2003: Zàpping prize 2002 for the best sports programme, awarded by Teleespectadors Associats de Catalunya.

2003: prize for the best state documentary at the VI Ciudad de Santander International Sport Film Festival for the documentary Blind Summit, broadcast on 7 July 2002. The film shows the experiences of a group of blind climbers while climbing Mt Aneto.

2004: at the 22nd edition of the International Festival of Mountain and Adventure Films of Torelló the plaque of the Federación Española de Deportes de Montaña y Escalada for the "best film by a Spanish producer " was awarded to Jaume Altadill for Important things walk slowly a biography about two of the pioneers of Catalan mountaineering: Josep Manuel Anglada and Jordi Pons.

2006: at the 24th edition of the International Festival of Mountain and Adventure Films of Torelló the plaque of the Spanish Federation of Mountain Sports and Climbing for the "best film by a Spanish producer" was awarded to Jimi Pujol for El Cavall Bernat a re-creation of the first ascent of this needle at Montserrat, broadcast on 27 October 2005, the 70th anniversary of this feat.

Temps d'Aventura Prize

Since 2004 the programme has sponsored a prize, which takes its name from the programme, and is awarded at the International Festival of Mountain and Adventure Films of Torelló.
The prize is awarded to the film that is best adapted for television.

Prize-winning films are:

 2004: "Hydrophilia" by Jesús Bosque. Spain
 2005: "Dhaulagiri 1954: Argentines in the Himalayas" by Ignacio Aguirre and Romina Coronel. Argentina.
 2006: "GurlaMandata.com" by Johan Perrier. France
 2007: "Patagonia Dreams" by M. Lecomte, O. Favresse, S. Villanueva and N. Favresse. Belgium.
 2008: "Knocking on heaven's door" by Robin Kaleta. Czech Republic.

Team

 Director: Antoni Real
 Producer: Narcís Noguera
 Production Manager:
 Anna Maria López 2009
 Pietat Gallardo (2008)
 Ester Poses (2006-2007)
 Lluís Palahí (2002-2005)
 Editor:
 Jordi Fandiño 2005
 Josep Maria Puig (2002-2006)
 Production
 Jimi Pujol 2004
 Xavier Casillanis (2008)
 Víctor Díaz (2002-2003)

Index for reports

External links 
Temps d'aventura in english with videos
reports in HD and automatic translation in YouTube
Temps d'aventura podcast with english subtitles in iTunes
Temps d'aventura podcast in catalan in iTunes
Temps d'aventura videos (in catalan)
Temps d'aventura videos in Google Maps
Televisió de Catalunya
TV3 YouTube channel
How to watch TVCi
Catalan Broadcast Corporation

Catalan television programmes
Travel television series
Outdoor recreation
Spanish sports television series